Slope Mountain is a mountain in the North Slope Borough, Alaska located  southwest of the confluence of the Ribdon River and the Sagavanirktok River, 14 km (8 mi) east of Imnavait Mountain.

It is located at mile post 300 on the Dalton Highway, and falls on the northern boundary of Bureau of Land Management managed land.

References

Mountains of North Slope Borough, Alaska